Finn Keane, known professionally as Easyfun (stylised in all caps and formerly as easyFun), is a British songwriter and record producer. He is known for his work with Charli XCX; he has songwriting and production credits on her mixtapes Number 1 Angel and Pop 2 (both 2017), as well as on her album Charli. Other work has included releases on experimental pop label PC Music, and writing for pop musicians.

Easyfun's first release was in 2013, with a five track self-titled EP with a proto-version of what would become PC Music's signature sound of bubblegum pop, futuristic riffs and chaotic arrangements. Since then, he has released one other solo EP and four singles, with the largest portion of his output since then arriving in the form of collaborative projects.

Discography

EPs

Singles

Songwriting and production credits

Remixes

References 

PC Music artists
Living people
Year of birth missing (living people)
Hyperpop musicians